Charles Raymond Loring II (May 20, 1943 – September 6, 2008), known professionally as "Ray Loring", was a classically trained American television music composer and professor, in Massachusetts.

Born in Illinois to Howard and Rena Loring, they moved to Georgetown, Massachusetts. He graduated from Perley High School in his home town of Georgetown. He studied piano with Fred Noonan, the White House pianist to Franklin Roosevelt and Harry Truman. He studied at Yale University at Timothy Dwight College; particularly with the late Edmund Morgan. He was a member of Scroll and Key.

During his senior year at Yale he was granted the Woodrow Wilson Fellowship and used it for his studies at Brandeis University Graduate School of Music; studying under Seymour Shifrin, Arthur Berger and Harold Shapero.

Loring taught music, performed, and conducted at Endicott College from 1980 to 1992. He then went to freelance music composing full-time, but lectured regularly at Amherst College and Northern Essex Community College. He had recently returned to teaching, on the music faculty at Gordon College.

Loring composed his first film score in 1971; the locally acclaimed short film "Ruby". He continued composing throughout his life. During the course of his career, Loring composed scores for more than 100 episodes of PBS/WGBH Boston's NOVA series, plus the theme music.

He contributed music to many other PBS, Discovery Channel, History Channel episodes; in addition to work with museum installations, historical visitor centers, etc. throughout the U.S. including the Harry Truman Museum, the theater at the National Archives Rotunda, the Museum of the Mississippi, and the Brooklyn Historical Society.  In 2004 he was commissioned to provide an arrangement for the Astoria Jazz Band, for inclusion in the 9th Annual Festival of Women in Jazz Composers at the Kennedy Center in Washington, DC.

Additionally, Ray Loring composed and performed for the Essex Chamber Music Players in Andover, Massachusetts.  A recording of Loring's "June on the Merrimack", which sets to music the words of local abolitionist poet John Greenleaf Whittier, is being prepared by the Essex Chamber Music Players (ECMP and will be released in 2020.  For more information about ECMP's Ray Loring Recording Fund, and to learn about ECMP's mission "preserving local cultural history through music" contact Michael Finegold at www.essexchambermusicplayers.org. 
 
In his leisure Ray enjoyed mountain hiking; and had completed the New Hampshire 48 and the New England 67, both highly regarded accomplishments in the hiking world. He died suddenly on a cold, stormy day, near the top of Nubble Peak in New Hampshire despite the heroic rescue efforts of his fellow hikers: see "viewsfromthetop".com.  Immediate survivors include his father Howard Loring (d. 2012); 1st cousins Eileen Murray of CA, Charlotte M. Chapin of No. Palm Beach FL.

Commissions and scores

Nova (music theme) (53 episodes, 1997–2007) (composer: theme music) (2 episodes, 2006)
 Pocahontas Revealed (2007) TV episode (music theme)
 Saved by the Sun (2007) TV episode (music theme)
 Kings of Camouflage (2007) TV episode (music theme)
 First Flower (2007) TV episode (music theme)
 The Last Great Ape (2007) TV episode (music theme)

Nova ScienceNow (music theme) (39 episodes, 2005–2007)
 Aging (2007) TV episode (music theme)
 Maya (2007) TV episode (music theme)
 Profile: Bonnie Bassler (2007) TV episode (music theme)
 Space Elevator (2007) TV episode (music theme)
 1918 Flu (2006) TV episode (music theme)

Why the Towers Fell (2002) (TV) (composer: additional music)

Composer:

"Nova" (9 episodes, 1998–2006)
 The Deadliest Plane Crash (2006) TV episode
 Saving the National Treasures (2005) TV episode
 Descent Into the Ice (2004) TV episode
 Dogs and More Dogs (2004) TV episode
 Dirty Bomb (2003) TV episode

Einstein Revealed (1996) (TV)
 "Secrets of Lost Empires II" (1996) TV series (unknown episodes)
 Ruby (1971) Producer

References
http://www.essexchambermusicplayers.org/players.html#MichaelFinegold

https://www.findagrave.com/memorial/39039368

American television composers
1943 births
2008 deaths
American male composers
Endicott College faculty
20th-century American composers
20th-century American male musicians